lsh is a free software implementation of the Secure Shell (SSH) protocol version 2, by the GNU Project including both server and client programs. Featuring Secure Remote Password protocol (SRP) as specified in secsh-srp besides, public-key authentication. Kerberos is somewhat supported as well. Currently however for password verification only, not as a single sign-on (SSO) method.

lsh was started from scratch and predates OpenSSH.

Karim Yaghmour concluded in 2003 that lsh was "not fit for use" in production embedded Linux systems, because of its dependencies upon other software packages that have a multiplicity of further dependencies. The lsh package requires the GNU MP library, zlib, and liboop, the latter of which in turn requires GLib, which then requires pkg-config.  Yaghmour further notes that lsh suffers from cross-compilation problems that it inherits from glib. "If […] your target isn't the same architecture as your host," he states, "LSH isn't a practical choice at this time."

Debian provides packages of lsh as lsh-server, lsh-utils, lsh-doc and lsh-client.

See also

 Comparison of SSH servers
 Comparison of SSH clients
 TCP Wrappers
 GnuTLS

References

External links
lsh homepage

GNU Project software
Unix network-related software
Free security software
Free network-related software
Secure Shell